Eichenberg may refer to:

Places
 Eichenberg, Austria, a municipality in the district of Bregenz in the state of Vorarlberg, Austria
 Eichenberg, Hildburghausen, a municipality in the district of Hildburghausen in the state of Thuringia, Germany
 Eichenberg, Saale-Holzland, a municipality in the district of Saale-Holzland in the state of Thuringia, Germany
 a summit near to Frammersbach in Main-Spessart district in the Regierungsbezirk of Lower Franconia (Unterfranken) in Bavaria, Germany]
 Eichenberg station, in Neu-Eichenberg, Hesse, Germany.

People with the surname
 Fritz Eichenberg (1901–1990), German-American illustrator
 Liam Eichenberg (born 1998), American football player
 Tim Eichenberg (born 1951), American politician
 Wilhelm Eichenberg (fl. 1930s), geologist and zoologist

German-language surnames